Henry McDonald may refer to:

 Henry McDonald (American football) (1890–1976), American football player
 Henry McDonald (engineer), professor of engineering
 Henry McDonald (writer) (–2023), Northern Irish writer and journalist
 Hank McDonald (Henry Monroe McDonald, 1911–1982), Major League Baseball pitcher
 Henry P. McDonald, architect

See also
 Henry MacDonald (1823–1893), Scottish recipient of the VC
Harry McDonald (disambiguation)